Scott Allen (born December 18, 1965) is an American businessman and Republican politician.  He is a member of the Wisconsin State Assembly, representing central Waukesha County.

Biography

From Waukesha, Wisconsin, Scott served in the United States Army Reserve and received his bachelor's degree in political science from University of Wisconsin–Milwaukee and his master's degree in urban planning/public administration. He also went to University of Wisconsin–Oshkosh and University of Wisconsin–Waukesha. Allen is in the real estate business. He also served on the Waukesha Common Council and is a Republican.

On November 4, 2014, Allen was elected to the Wisconsin State Assembly. He serves in Senate District 33, Assembly District 97.

In 2015, Allen recorded a "Christmas message" for the Wisconsin Assembly Republicans' YouTube channel. In that video, he proselytizes, "For those who may watch this who are not Christians, I invite you to consider the hope offered by the Prince of Peace," and he quotes the Bible: “We are not of those who shrink back and are destroyed, but of those who believe and are saved" (Hebrews 10:39).

In June 2019, Allen criticized flying the Gay Pride flag over the Wisconsin capitol for LGBT Pride Month. He tweeted, "Is this any more appropriate than erecting the Christian flag over the Capitol?" In an interview with the Associated Press, he stated, the flag "advocates a behavior or lifestyle that some Wisconsin residents may not condone. Therefore, it is divisive."

Electoral History

2014

References

Living people
Politicians from Waukesha, Wisconsin
Military personnel from Wisconsin
Businesspeople from Wisconsin
University of Wisconsin–Milwaukee alumni
University of Wisconsin–Oshkosh alumni
Wisconsin city council members
Republican Party members of the Wisconsin State Assembly
21st-century American politicians
United States Army soldiers
United States Army reservists
1965 births